San-nakji is a variety of hoe (raw dish) made with long arm octopus (Octopus minor), a small octopus species called nakji in Korean and is sometimes translated into "baby octopus" due to its relatively small size compared to the giant octopus (Enteroctopus dofleini). The octopuses are most commonly killed before being cut into small pieces and served, with the nerve activity in the octopus' tentacles making the pieces move posthumously on the plate while served. The octopus' highly complex nervous system, with two-thirds of its neurons localised in the nerve cords of its arms, lets the octopus show a variety of reflex actions that persist even when they have no input from the brain.  Less commonly, a live octopus is eaten whole. The dish is sprinkled with sesame oil and toasted sesame seeds.

Eating
Because the suction cups on the arm pieces are still active when the dish is served, special care should be taken when eating sannakji. The active suction cups can cause swallowed pieces of arm to stick to the mouth or throat. This can also present a choking hazard for some people, particularly if they are intoxicated.

Language difference
Vocabularies in the two Koreas differ on nakji: South Koreans call Octopus minor, a small kind of octopus (often mistranslated as "baby octopus") nakji, while North Koreans call a squid nakji (nakchi in McCune–Reischauer romanization).

Prevalence
Sannakji is served in Korean restaurants that serve sliced raw fish, but it also can be found at bars as a snack to accompany alcoholic beverages, such as soju.

Health hazard
Consuming sannakji is potentially dangerous due to choking hazard. Because the cephalopod's limbs contain neurons, the extremities continue to move and the suction cups along its tentacles maintain their gripping power that might attach to one's throat, even after getting detached from the body and doused with sesame oil. Several incidents of choking on Sannakji have been reported, such as a 2008 incident in Gwangju.

See also

 Drunken shrimp, shrimp sometimes eaten alive in Chinese cuisine
 Ikizukuri, the preparation of sashimi from living animals
 Odori ebi, shrimp eaten alive in Japanese cuisine

References

Korean cuisine
Octopus dishes
Cruelty to animals
Dishes involving the consumption of live animals
Potentially dangerous food